Guler was a small precolonial Indian hill state in the Lower Himalayas. Its capital was the town of Haripur Guler, in modern-day Himachal Pradesh. The kingdom was founded in 1415 by Raja Hari Chand, a scion of the ancient royal family of Kangra.

Guler State is famous as the birthplace of Kangra painting in the first half of the 18th century when a family of Kashmiri painters trained in Mughal painting sought shelter at the court of Raja Dalip Singh (r. 1695–1741) of Guler. The rise of Guler Paintings or Guler style started in what is known as the early phase of Kangra art.

History

Early history
According to legends, the Guler state was founded at an uncertain date between 1405 and 1450 by Raja Hari Chand. One fateful day, he fell into a dry well while hunting. Since no one could find him, the Raja was presumed dead and his brother was then named the Raja of Kangra State. When Raja Hari Chand was eventually brought back alive from the well, instead of fighting for his rights to the throne, he founded the town of Haripur on the valley below the fort by the Banganga River.

Sikh Empire and British Raj
In 1813, Guler state was annexed by the Sikh Empire under Maharaja Ranjit Singh. Bhup Singh (1765 - 1826) was the last ruling king. He was given a Jagir in Nandpur by Ranjit Singh in 1826. The Jagir was recognized by the British government in 1853. In 1877, his son Shamsher Singh died without male heirs and the state lapsed.

Rulers
A list of rulers of the Guler state who formerly bore the title Mian and later 'Raja'.

Rajas 

 1247- 1267.       Hari Chander
 1271- 1292.       Gun Chand
 1293- 1310.       Udhan Chander
 1310 - 1333.      Swaran Chand
 1333- 1347.       Gyan Chander
 1348 - 1367.     Narender Chander
 1367 - 1389.     Udhen Chander
 1389 - 1414.    Rattan Chander
 1415 - 1433.    Garud Chander
 1433 - 1438.    Gambhir Chand
 1448 - 1464.    Abhay Chander
 1464 - 1471.    Uttam Chander
 1481 - 1503.    Prithvi Chander
 1503 - 1526     Karan Chander

1526 – 1550   Ram Chand (Fifteenth ruler)
1550 –             Jagdish Chand
1568 -                 Rup Chand
 
 
1635 – 1661   Man Singh
1661 – 1675   Vikram Singh
1695 – 1741   Dalip Singh    (b. 1688 – d. 1741)
1695 – 1705   Bilas Devi (f) -Regent
1730 – 1741   Govardhan Singh -Regent   (b. 1713 – d. 1773)

1773 – 1790   Prakash Singh   (b. 1748 – d. 1820)
1790 – 1813   Bhup Singh    (b. 1765 – d. 1826)

Guler paintings 
The Guler state became famous for its Kangra paintings. Guler style painting constitutes the early phase of Kangra Kalam.  Around the middle of the eighteenth century, some Hindu artists trained in Mughal style sought the patronage of the Rajas of Guler in the Kangra Valley. 

Of the hill states, Guler has the longest tradition in the art of painting. During the rule of Raja Dalip Singh (1645–1743), artists were working at Haripur, Guler. However, it was during the reign of Govardhan Chand (1743–1773) that an active school of painting developed at Haripur, Guler. There are numerous portraits of the king in the Chandigarh Museum.  Govardhan Chand's son, Prakash Chand (1773–1779), continued the patronage of artists. His son, Bhup Chand (1790–1826), had artists working under him. Painting in Guler continued right up to the close of the 19th century.

The art of Guler style painting flourished in families with distinguishable styles and techniques, most significant amo them were that of Pandit Seu of Guler, who died in about 1740, and his sons, Nainsukh and Manaku. Later, while Manaku worked at Guler, Nainsukh migrated to Jammu.

See also
List of Rajput dynasties
Kangra painting
Pahari painting
Bashohli

References

Further reading
 (see index: p. 148-152, for more information about Guler Painting)

External links

Princely states of Punjab
History of Himachal Pradesh
Kangra district
Schools of Indian painting
Rajputs